Eumicrodynerus is a small palearctic genus of potter wasps. Symmorphoides maroccanus was originally described by the Italian entomologist Antonio Giordani Soika in 1977 but this taxon was shown to be synonymous with Eumicrodynerus longicorpus. although E. longicorpus and E. maroccanus are still listed as separate species in some sources.

References

 Vecht, J.v.d. & J.M. Carpenter. 1990. A Catalogue of the genera of the Vespidae (Hymenoptera). Zoologische Verhandelingen 260: 3 - 62.

Biological pest control wasps
Potter wasps